In algebra and number theory, a distribution is a function on a system of finite sets into an abelian group which is analogous to an integral: it is thus the algebraic analogue of a distribution in the sense of generalised function.

The original examples of distributions occur, unnamed, as functions φ on Q/Z satisfying

Such distributions are called ordinary distributions.  They also occur in p-adic integration theory in Iwasawa theory.

Let ... → Xn+1 → Xn → ... be a projective system of finite sets with surjections, indexed by the natural numbers, and let X be their projective limit.  We give each Xn the discrete topology, so that X is compact.  Let φ = (φn) be a family of functions on Xn taking values in an abelian group V and compatible with the projective system:

for some weight function w.  The family φ is then a distribution on the projective system X.

A function f on X is "locally constant", or a "step function" if it factors through some Xn.  We can define an integral of a step function against φ as

The definition extends to more general projective systems, such as those indexed by the positive integers ordered by divisibility.  As an important special case consider the projective system Z/nZ indexed by positive integers ordered by divisibility.   We identify this with the system (1/n)Z/Z with limit Q/Z.

For x in R we let ⟨x⟩ denote the fractional part of x normalised to 0 ≤ ⟨x⟩ < 1, and let {x} denote the fractional part normalised to 0 < {x} ≤ 1.

Examples

Hurwitz zeta function
The multiplication theorem for the Hurwitz zeta function

gives a distribution relation

Hence for given s, the map  is a distribution on Q/Z.

Bernoulli distribution
Recall that the Bernoulli polynomials  Bn are defined by

for n ≥ 0, where bk are the Bernoulli numbers, with  generating function

They satisfy the distribution relation

Thus the map

defined by

is a distribution.

Cyclotomic units
The cyclotomic units satisfy distribution relations.  Let a be an element of Q/Z prime to p and let ga denote exp(2πia)−1.  Then for a≠ 0 we have

Universal distribution
One considers the distributions on Z with values in some abelian group V and seek the "universal" or most general distribution possible.

Stickelberger distributions
Let h be an ordinary distribution on Q/Z taking values in a field F.  Let G(N) denote the multiplicative group of Z/NZ, and for any function f on G(N) we extend f to a function on Z/NZ by taking f to be zero off G(N).  Define an element of the group algebra F[G(N)] by

The group algebras form a projective system with limit X.  Then the functions gN form a distribution on Q/Z with values in X, the Stickelberger distribution associated with h.

p-adic measures
Consider the special case when the value group V of a distribution φ on X takes values in a local field K, finite over Qp, or more generally, in a finite-dimensional
p-adic Banach space W over K, with valuation |·|.  We call φ a measure if |φ| is bounded on compact open subsets of X.  Let D be the ring of integers of K and L a lattice in W, that is, a free D-submodule of W with K⊗L = W.  Up to scaling a measure may be taken to have values in L.

Hecke operators and measures
Let D be a fixed integer prime to p and consider ZD, the limit of the system Z/pnD.  Consider any eigenfunction of the Hecke operator Tp with eigenvalue λp prime to p.  We describe a procedure for deriving a measure of ZD.

Fix an integer N prime to p and to D.  Let F be the D-module of all functions on rational numbers with denominator coprime to N.  For any prime l not dividing N we define the Hecke operator Tl by

Let f be an eigenfunction for Tp with eigenvalue λp in D.  The quadratic equation X2 − λpX + p = 0 has roots π1, π2 with π1 a unit and  π2 divisible by p.  Define a sequence a0 = 2, a1 = π1+π2 = λp and

so that

References

 
 
 

Algebra
Number theory